Miguel Romo Medina (born 19 January 1949) is a Mexican politician affiliated with the PRI. He currently serves as Senator of the LXII Legislature of the Mexican Congress representing Aguascalientes. He also was Municipal President of Aguascalientes, Aguascalientes during the 1984-1986 period.

See also
 List of mayors of Aguascalientes

References

1949 births
Living people
People from Aguascalientes City
Institutional Revolutionary Party politicians
Members of the Senate of the Republic (Mexico)
20th-century Mexican politicians
21st-century Mexican politicians
Politicians from Aguascalientes
National Autonomous University of Mexico alumni
Members of the Congress of Aguascalientes
Municipal presidents of Aguascalientes
Senators of the LXII and LXIII Legislatures of Mexico